Reservoir is an unincorporated community and census-designated place (CDP) in Blair County, Pennsylvania, United States. It was first listed as a CDP prior to the 2020 census.

The CDP is in south-central Blair County, in the eastern part of Blair Township. It is on the south side of the valley of the Frankstown Branch Juniata River. Reservoir Road is the main street through the community, leading northeast  to Loop and southwest  to McKee.

References 

Census-designated places in Blair County, Pennsylvania
Census-designated places in Pennsylvania